Ohio's 80th House of Representatives district encompasses both Ottawa and Erie Counties, with the major population centers being Port Clinton, Oak Harbor, Genoa, Marblehead, Sandusky, Huron, Berlin Heights and Vermilion. District 89 is largely a rural, agricultural district with a few tourist attractions such as Kelley's Island and Cedar Point.

Representatives

Elections

2020

2018

2016

2014

2012

2010

References

Ohio House of Representatives districts
Ottawa County, Ohio
Erie County, Ohio